Muroki Mbote Wa Githinji (born 2000/2001), known mononymously as Muroki, is a Kenyan-New Zealand reggae musician. A member of the bands Cloak Bay and Masaya, Muroki debuted as a solo musician in 2019. In 2021, Muroki's song "Wavy" became a hit single in New Zealand.

Biography

Muroki grew up in Raglan, New Zealand, and at 14 decided he wanted to become a musician. Together with Lennox Reynolds, the pair formed the group Cloak Bay, releasing their debut extended play Digi Town and the Boogie Boys in 2017. In 2019, Muroki began releasing music as the bassist for the band Masaya.

In 2019, Muroki released his debut solo single "For Better or Worse", which caught the attention of New Zealand musician Benee, who played it during her appearance on Elton John's podcast Rocket Hour. Benee later reached out to Muroki over Instagram, and asked him to perform as a supporting act of her New Zealand tour in late 2020. In October 2020, Benee signed Muroki as the first musician on Olive Records, her personal imprint label.

In April 2021, Muroki released Dawn, an extended play he had been working on for a year alongside producers Josh Fountain and Djeisan Suskov. The lead single from the EP, "Wavy", became a hit in New Zealand later in the year, and during Te Wiki o te Reo Māori Muroki released a Te Reo version of the song, entitled "Rehurehu".

Discography

Extended plays

Singles

As lead artist

As lead artist

Other charted songs

Guest appearances

Notes

References

External links
 

21st-century New Zealand male singers
Living people
Māori-language singers
New Zealand male singer-songwriters
New Zealand people of Kenyan descent
New Zealand record producers
New Zealand reggae musicians
People from Raglan, New Zealand
Year of birth missing (living people)